Roland Goriupp (born 24 April 1971 in Graz) is an Austrian retired football player.

International career
Goriupp played his only game for Austria national football team in 2002 in a 2-6 loss to Germany.

National team statistics

References

External links
  

1981 births
Living people
Austrian footballers
Austria international footballers
Grazer AK players
SK Sturm Graz players
FC Kärnten players
Association football goalkeepers